is a 1961 color Japanese film about the 47 Ronin directed by Sadatsugu Matsuda. It earned ¥435 million at the annual box office, making it the second highest-grossing film of 1961. Ako Roshi was produced by Toei, and Shigeru Okada. It is based on the novel written by Jiro Osaragi.

Cast

See also 
 Forty-seven Ronin

Other films about Forty-seven ronin:
 The 47 Ronin (元禄忠臣蔵, Genroku chushingura) - 1941 film by Kenji Mizoguchi
 Akō Rōshi: Ten no Maki, Chi no Maki (赤穂浪士　天の巻　地の巻) - 1956 film by Sadatsugu Matsuda
 The Loyal 47 Ronin (忠臣蔵 Chushingura) - 1958 film by Kunio Watanabe, Daiei star-studded cast 
 Chushingura: Hana no Maki, Yuki no Maki - 1962 film by Hiroshi Inagaki, Toho star-studded cast 
 Nagadosu chūshingura, 1962 action film by Kunio Watanabe
 Daichūshingura (大忠臣蔵, Daichūshingura) - 1971 television dramatization
 The Fall of Ako Castle (赤穂城断絶, Akō-jō danzetsu) (aka Swords Of Vengeance) - 1978 film by Kinji Fukasaku
 Akō Rōshi  - 1979 television dramatization

References

External links 
 

1961 films
Films about the Forty-seven Ronin
Films directed by Sadatsugu Matsuda
Jidaigeki films
Samurai films
Toei Company films
1960s martial arts films
1960s Japanese films